Calathus advena is a species of ground beetle in the family Carabidae, found in North America. It is sometimes considered a species of the genus Acalathus.

References

Further reading

External links

 

advena
Articles created by Qbugbot
Beetles described in 1846